Limberg Méndez Justiniano (born September 18, 1973 in Santa Cruz de la Sierra) is a Bolivian football retired striker who played in the Liga de Fútbol Profesional Boliviano from 1997 to 2008.

Club career
Throughout his professional career he played for several clubs including Guabirá, The Strongest, Mariscal Braun, Blooming, Aurora and La Paz FC.

International career
Between 2003 and 2008, Méndez earned nine caps for the Bolivia national team, scoring only one goal in a friendly match against Panama on August 31, 2003. He was previously called up for the 1997 Copa América, but never played in that tournament.

References

External links

1973 births
Living people
Sportspeople from Santa Cruz de la Sierra
Association football forwards
Bolivian footballers
Bolivia international footballers
1997 Copa América players
Guabirá players
The Strongest players
Club Aurora players
La Paz F.C. players
Club Blooming players